"Des Mots qui résonnent!" (English: Some words which resonate!) is a song recorded by the French singer Jenifer Bartoli. It was released in December 2002 as the third single from her first album Jenifer, on which it features as first or 12th track following the editions. It achieved success in France and Belgium (Wallonia), reaching the top four.

Song information
The song was written by Swedish hit makers Linus Nordén, Patrick Ebson and Ian-Paolo Lira. The French adaptation was written by Christian Bouclier and produced by Benjamin Raffaëlli. The song has rock sonorities, particularly the refrain which is played on guitar.

In France, the single debuted at a peak of number four, on 7 December 2002 and reached this position other two times. It totaled seven weeks in the top ten, 17 weeks in the top 50 and 23 weeks in the top 100. The single features at number 44 on the Annual Chart. As of July 2014, it is the 104th best-selling single of the 21st century in France, with 298,000 units sold.

In Belgium (Wallonia), the single was charted for 15 weeks on the Ultratop 50, from 12 December 2002. It went to number 13, reached number three for four consecutive weeks, then dropped on the chart. It totaled eight weeks in the top ten. Certified Gold disc, it was ranked at number 47 on the End of the Year Chart.

In Switzerland, the single debuted at number 47 on 15 December 2002 and hit number 15. Then it dropped slowly and remained for 14 weeks in the top 50 and 21 weeks in the top 100. It is Jenifer's most successful single in this country.

Track listings
 CD single
 "Des Mots qui résonnent!" — 3:24
 "Nos Points communs" (Marc Lavoine/Georges Lunghini) — 3:56

 Digital download
 "Des Mots qui résonnent!" — 3:24
 "Des Mots qui résonnent!" (2005 live version) — 4:08

Credits

Personnel
"Des mots qui résonnent !"
Benjamin Raffaëlli: guitar & programming
Nicolas Neidhardt: keyboards
Laurent Vernerey: bass guitar
Ian Thomas: drums
Valérie Belinga: backing vocals
Guillaume Eyango: backing vocals
Jean-François Berger: string arrangement & conducting
"Nos points communs"
Philippe Russo: guitar
François Delabrière: additional guitar
Matthew Vaughan: programming
Laurent Vernerey: bass guitar
Christophe Deschamps: drums
Jean-François Berger: string arrangement & conducting, keyboards & programming

Production
"Des mots qui résonnent!" produced by Benjamin Raffaëlli
"Nos points communs" produced by Jean-François Berger & François Delabrière

Design
Antoine Verglas: front cover photography
Michel Sedan: back cover photography
Happydesign: cover design

Charts and sales

Weekly charts

Year-end charts

Certifications

References

External links
 "Des Mots qui résonnent!", lyrics + music video

2002 singles
Jenifer (singer) songs